The California giant salamander (Dicamptodon ensatus) is a species of salamander in the family Ambystomatidae. Dicamptodon ensatus is endemic to California, in the western United States.  The species once additionally included individuals now belonging to the species D. aterrimus (Idaho giant salamander) and D. tenebrosus (coastal giant salamander), under the common name Pacific giant salamander, which now refers to the genus and family.

Taxonomy
The Pacific giant salamander (D. ensatus) was thought to consist of three geographic populations, an Idaho isolates, a group in northern California, and a group in Oregon and Washington. In 1989 genetic studies showed that the D. ensatus populations consisted of three species: the Idaho giant salamander (Dicamptodon aterrimus) in Idaho, and two highly divergent species with a narrow hybrid zone in California, the coastal giant salamander (Dicamptodon tenebrosus) (ranging from northern California to Washington) and the California giant salamander (Dicamptodon ensatus) (ranging from Santa Cruz County to Mendocino County).
A fourth species of Dicamptodon, Cope's giant salamander (D. copei), lives on the Olympic Peninsula, Washington.

Habitat
The natural habitats of D. ensatus are damp temperate forests and clear, cold freshwater streams, ponds, and lakes.

Description
The adult California giant salamander can reach 17–30.5 cm (6.7–12 inches) in total length (including tail). Like most salamanders, the California giant salamander has four toes on the front feet and five toes on the back feet. The California giant salamander's tail is approximately 40% of the total length of the salamander and is laterally compressed. The head, back, and sides of the salamander have a marbled or reticulate pattern of dark blotches on a light brown or brassy-colored background. They have a broad head with a shovel-like snout and a fold of skin across the throat called the gular fold. The eyes are medium in size and have a brass-flecked iris and a large black pupil. This species is one of the few salamanders capable of vocalizing.

Terrestrial adults search for prey such as snails, slugs, insects (such as beetles, caddisfly larvae, moths, and flies), other invertebrates, small mice (such as white-footed mice), shrews, possibly reptiles, and other amphibians under surface objects and in tunnels, whereas aquatic adults and larvae eat aquatic invertebrates, fish, snakes, and other amphibians. California giant salamanders are preyed upon by the American water shrew (Sorex palustris) and the western aquatic garter snake (Thamnophis couchi).

Reproduction and development
The California giant salamander breeds from March to May, with egg-laying peaking in May. Eggs are concealed several feet below the surface in cold, slowly flowing water often beneath rocks and coarse woody debris in stream bottoms. Adults sometimes stay near their nests. Larvae may lose their external gills and transform to terrestrial adults after 1 to 2 years. In permanently perennial streams, adults may retain their gills and become aquatic adults. (See Neotenes below.)

Geographic range
The California giant salamander is endemic to Northern California and lives up to  primarily in damp, coastal forests including coast Douglas fir (Pseudotsuga menziesii var. menziesii) and California coast redwood (Sequoia sempervirens) in both montane and valley-foothill riparian habitats. They tend to be common where they occur. The adult terrestrial form is found under surface litter and in tunnels, while the adult aquatic and larval forms are found mainly in cool, rocky streams and occasionally in lakes and ponds.

It is found in two (possibly three) isolated regions. The first range includes Sonoma, Napa, and Marin Counties, southwestern Lake County, western Glenn County, and southern Mendocino County. The other documented region is south of the San Francisco Bay from central San Mateo County to southern Santa Cruz County plus western Santa Clara County. The California giant salamander does not occur in the East Bay, forming a gap between these two populations. There is an unconfirmed sight record from Big Sur in Monterey County, approximately 75 miles (100 km) to the south of the documented population in the Santa Cruz area.

Neotenes
Some California giant salamander larvae continue to grow into adults and become sexually mature without losing their external gills.  This process is called neoteny.  Adult-sized neotenes have a uniform brown coloring on their heads, sides, and backs and retained external gills which allow them to live in perennial streams as aquatic adults.

References

Further reading
Stebbins RC (2003). A Field Guide to Western Reptiles and Amphibians, Third Edition. The Peterson Field Guide Series ®. Boston and New York: Houghton Mifflin Company. xiii + 533 pp., 56 color plates. . (Dicamptodon ensatus, p. 158 + Plate 3 + Map 1).

Dicamptodon
Amphibians of the United States
Salamander
Natural history of the California Coast Ranges
Taxonomy articles created by Polbot
Amphibians described in 1833